The Goose Hollow Inn is a tavern in Portland, Oregon. Former mayor Bud Clark opened it in 1967.

Description 

The Goose Hollow Inn is most known for its Reuben sandwich. The tavern's mission statement, which is printed on the menus, states: "We are dedicated to Quality Draft, Fine Food, Pleasant Music, and Stimulating Company. We are also dedicated to extremes of opinion, hoping that a livable marriage will result. If physical violence is your nature, either develop your verbal ability or leave."

The walls of the interior are covered in artwork, photographs, posters, and old beer advertisements accumulated over the course of the tavern's history. They include a copy of Clark's iconic Expose Yourself to Art poster. The Goose Hollow Inn contains only a single television and, unlike many other taverns in Portland, no video poker machines. The former mayor described the business as his legacy during an interview with Oregon Public Broadcasting. “It’s put together well, it still runs, my daughter runs it well,' he said. "And I’ve met so many friends here.”

History 
Clark and his wife, Sigrid Fehrenbacher, originally bought the Spatenhaus Tavern in downtown Portland in 1962 for $1,600 and had to borrow money to purchase beer for its grand opening. The Spatenhaus closed and was demolished in 1967 to clear the way for the construction for the Ira Keller Fountain. That same year, Clark bought Ann's Tavern on SW 19th and Jefferson and later christened it the Goose Hollow Inn. The name was inspired by the surrounding area's nickname, which had was coined in the 1890s following a dispute between local residents over the ownership of several geese.
It had fallen into disuse by the mid 20th century. Clark's decision to use Goose Hollow in the name helped rekindle an interest in both the neighborhood and its history. 

Clark wrote the tavern's mission statement following a bar fight between two patrons. Former state congressman Stephen Kafoury's experience at the Goose Hollow Inn in the 1970s helped end Oregon's rules disallowing dancing in taverns. Clark told Kafoury he wasn't legally allowed to sing or dance on the property. The legislator later successfully managed to change the law.

Budweiser once credited the Goose Hollow Inn with selling more of their beer per square foot than any other tavern in the United States. In 1983, Clark dubbed the company "a tyrant" and vowed to stop purchasing their products following the appearance of several Budweiser employees in a television advertisement advocating against a voter-initiated referendum to create a law requiring deposits on beverage containers. 

Fehrenbacher took over operations of the tavern when Clark successfully became mayor of Portland in 1984. He returned to manage the Goose Hollow Inn following his departure from politics in 1992. In the years that followed, Clark continued to be a regular sight at both the tavern and the Fehrenbacher Hof, the coffeehouse next door that is also owned by the Clark family. In 2011, the restaurant hosted a release party for a book about the Goose Hollow neighborhood.

Clark's death on February 1, 2021, was marked by condolences from many of the business's regulars as well as public figures including Congressman Earl Blumenauer and City Commissioner Jo Ann Hardesty. The tavern and the adjacent coffeehouse continue to be owned and operated by the Clark family.

Reception 
In 2020, Goose Hollow Inn ranked number 82 on MEDIAmerica's list of the "100 Best Fan-Favorite Destinations in Oregon".

References

External links

 
 

1967 establishments in Oregon
Goose Hollow, Portland, Oregon
Restaurants established in 1967
Restaurants in Portland, Oregon